Lake Hammar is a saline lake in southeastern part of Iraq within the Hammar Marshes. It has an area of 600–1,350 km2. Water level in the lake fluctuates, with maximum depths varying from 1.8 metres (winter) to 3.0 metres (spring). The lake is an important wetland site for birds. The native inhabitants are Marsh Arabs, some of whom occupy villages on artificial, floating islands.

Hammar Lacus, a feature on Titan, the moon of Saturn, is named after Hammar Lake.

References 

Lakes of Iraq
Wetlands of Iraq